Lilian's Story is a 1996 Australian film based on a 1985 novel by Australian author Kate Grenville, which was inspired by the life of Bea Miles, a famous Sydney nonconformist. The film stars Ruth Cracknell as Lilian and Barry Otto. Cracknell had been a Shakespearean actress of the stage for many years,

Reception 
Variety review of the picture commended the acting and called it "a touching saga of an eccentric but tenacious woman who’s haunted by demons from her troubled past."

Toni Collette won the Australian Film Institute award for supporting actress for her performance as the young Lilian in this film; the film was also nominated for best score.

References

External links

Lilian's Story at Oz Movies

Australian drama films
Films based on Australian novels
Films scored by Cezary Skubiszewski
1990s English-language films
1990s Australian films